During the 1979–80 season Catanzaro competed in Serie A and Coppa Italia. It was the club's second consecutive season and fourth overall season in the Serie A. The club participated in the Coppa Italia for the 25th time.

Squad

Competitions

Overview

Serie A

League table

Results summary

Points were only worth 2 for a win this season

Results by round

Matches

Coppa Italia

Group stage

Table (Group 2)

Matches (Group 2)

Squad statistics

References 
 calcio-seria.net 
 historical-lineups.com 
 webalice.it 

Catanzaro
U.S. Catanzaro 1929 seasons